Rafael Valentín Errázuriz Urmeneta (August 10, 1861 - December 26, 1923) was a Chilean politician and diplomat.

Rafael Valentín Errázuriz was born in Santiago, the son of Maximiano Errázuriz Valdivieso and of Amalia Urmeneta Quiroga. He completed his secondary studies at the Instituto Nacional, and later at the Universidad de Chile where he studied law. He was admitted to the bar on August 12, 1881. He joined the Conservative party very young; and on October 10, 1889, Errázuriz married Elvira Valdés Ortúzar, and together they had 6 children.

Errázuriz came from a well-known winemaking family. Later he took over Panquehue Errázuriz, the family's wine estate. Errázuriz was elected deputy several times, first for Ovalle (period 1888–1891), then for Illapel, Ovalle and Combarbalá (period 1891–1894) and for Lebu, Cañete and Arauco (period 1894–1897 and 1897–1900). He also served as a senator for Aconcagua between 1897 and 1906. President Federico Errázuriz Echaurren appointed him Ministers of Foreign Affairs, Cult and Colonization (1899–1900) and President Germán Riesco appointed him Minister of the Interior (1904).

In 1907, Errázuriz was named Ambassador to the Holy See, a position he held until 1921. He died in the city of Rome in 1923.

See also
José Tomás Errázuriz Urmenta
Pedro Nolasco Cruz Vergara

References

External links
Official biography 
Genealogical chart of Errázuriz family 

1861 births
1923 deaths
R
Members of the Chamber of Deputies of Chile
Members of the Senate of Chile
Chilean Ministers of the Interior
Foreign ministers of Chile
Ambassadors of Chile to the Holy See
Chilean diplomats
People from Santiago
Conservative Party (Chile) politicians